The election for mayor of the City and County of San Francisco was held on November 5, 2019. Incumbent Mayor London Breed, who had previously been elected in a special election to fill the unexpired term of the late Mayor Ed Lee, was reelected to a first full term in office. All local elections in California are nonpartisan.

Background
London Breed was elected Mayor of San Francisco in a 2018 special election to serve until 2020, filling the unexpired term of Ed Lee, who was elected in 2011 and 2015, and died in office on December 12, 2017. Breed stood for election to a first full term in office in 2019.

Candidates
The filing deadline was 5 p.m. on June 11, 2019. Among the candidates who qualified, only the incumbent Mayor Breed had a traditional political background.

Qualified
Ellen Lee Zhou, social worker and candidate for mayor in 2018
Joel Ventresca, retired San Francisco International Airport administrative analyst and perennial candidate in the 1990s
London Breed, incumbent Mayor of San Francisco
Paul Ybarra Robertson
Robert Jordan, street minister and San Francisco Board of Supervisors candidate from District 6 in 2006
Wilma Pang, professional singer/music educator and perennial candidate

Declined
 Mark Farrell, 44th Mayor of San Francisco, former Supervisor from District 2
 Mark Leno, former State Senator, former State Assemblyman, former San Francisco Supervisor representing District 8; candidate for Mayor in 2018 special election

Campaign

Ellen Lee Zhou was the conservative candidate in the race, running a campaign with pro-Donald Trump and pro-NRA messaging. Her campaign also criticized the city government's handling of homelessness. Shortly before the election, she erected a billboard on Dore Street featuring a caricature of Breed that many San Francisco politicians described as racist.

Joel Ventresca was endorsed by the San Francisco Green Party.

Results
The election used instant-runoff voting, also known as ranked-choice voting. However, Breed was reelected with a majority of the vote in the first round, and no transferring of votes was required. Although California municipal elections are nonpartisan, Ellen Lee Zhou, the second-place finisher and a self-described Republican, had the best performance for a candidate of her party in a San Francisco mayoral race since John Barbagelata in 1975.

Future 
In November 2022, San Francisco voters approved Proposition H, moving all future citywide elections to years that are multiples of four (thereby coinciding with presidential elections), beginning with 2024, and extending for one year the terms of incumbent citywide officeholders, including Breed. As a result, the mayoral term resulting from the 2019 election will now expire in January 2025 instead of January 2024 as originally planned.

References

Mayoral elections in San Francisco
San Francisco
San Francisco